Jeromy may refer to:
 Jeromy Burnitz, American former professional baseball player
 Jeromy Carriere, Canadian computer software engineer
 Jeromy Cox, American colorist
 Jeromy Farkas, American politician
 Jeromy James, Belizean footballer
 Jeromy Miles, American football safety
 Jeromy Shawn Deibler, member of FFH (band)

See also
 
 
 Jeremy (disambiguation)
 Jeremiah (disambiguation)
 Jeremie (disambiguation)
 Jerome (disambiguation)